The 1995 Texas Longhorns football team represented the University of Texas at Austin during the 1995 NCAA Division I-A football season. They were represented in the Southwest Conference in its final year of existence. They played their home games at Texas Memorial Stadium in Austin, Texas. The team was led by head coach John Mackovic.

Schedule

Personnel

Season summary

Pitt

at Notre Dame

at Texas A&M

Texas clinched the final SWC championship in the conference's second-to-last game.

Sugar Bowl

References

Texas
Texas Longhorns football seasons
Southwest Conference football champion seasons
Texas Longhorns football